The Greater Tampa Duramed Futures Classic was an annual golf tournament for professional women golfers on the Futures Tour, the LPGA Tour's developmental tour. The event was a part of the Futures Tour's schedule from 2003 to 2007. In 2003 it was played at Rogers Park Golf Course. In 2004 and 2005 it was played at East Lake Woodlands
Golf & Country Club. In 2006 and 2007 it was played at Summerfield Crossings Golf Club. All four courses are located in the Tampa, Florida area.

The tournament was a 54-hole event, as are most Futures Tour tournaments, and included pre-tournament pro-am opportunities, in which local amateur golfers can play with the professional golfers from the Tour as a benefit for local charities. The benefiting charities from the Greater Tampa Duramed Futures Classic were the American Cancer Society and The Mary and Martha House. 

The last tournament was held March 16–18, 2007.

Winners

Tournament records

External links
Futures Tour official website
Summerfield Crossings Golf Club official website

Former Symetra Tour events
Golf in Florida
Sports competitions in Tampa, Florida
Recurring sporting events established in 2003
Recurring sporting events disestablished in 2007
2003 establishments in Florida
2007 disestablishments in Florida